Matthew William Wright (24 July 1858 – 13 May 1949), known as Mat Wright, was an English cricketer who played in one first-class cricket match in 1889. He was born in Keyworth, Nottinghamshire.

Wright made his only first-class appearance for Nottinghamshire against MCC.  In Nottinghamshires' first-innings, he was run out for a duck.  In their second-innings, he scored 6 runs before being dismissed by Frederick Martin.

He made his debut for Buckinghamshire in the 1895 Minor Counties Championship against Oxfordshire, a match which marked both teams debut in the competition.  Wright played Minor counties cricket for Buckinghamshire from 1895 to 1913, making 143 appearances.

He died in Spital, Berkshire on 13 May 1949.

References

External links

1858 births
1949 deaths
People from Keyworth
Cricketers from Nottinghamshire
English cricketers
Nottinghamshire cricketers
Buckinghamshire cricketers